Kasi or KASI may refer to:

People
 Kasi (Pashtun tribe).
 Kasi Fine (born 1964), a Tongan rugby player.
 Kasi Kelly (born 1981), American beauty queen.
 Kasi Lemmons (born 1961), American film director and actress.
 Kasi Nayinar Pararacacekaran (died 1570), a ruler of the Jaffna kingdom.
 Kasi Palaniappan, Malaysian businessman.
 Kasi Viswanathan (born 1968), an Indian film editor.
 Mir Aimal Kansi (also spelled Kasi or Qasi), Pakistani national convicted of the 1993 shootings at CIA Headquarters.

Other uses
 Kasi (film), a Tamil language film.
 KASI, a radio station licensed to serve Ames, Iowa.
 Korea Astronomy and Space Science Institute, South Korea.
 Muang Kasi, a town in Laos

See also

 Kaasi (disambiguation)
 Kashi (disambiguation)
 Kazi (disambiguation)
 Khasi (disambiguation)
 Ghazi (disambiguation)
 Casimir, and variants, a form of the Polish name Kazimierz
 Township (South Africa), which for non-whites were called lokasie or kasie